Monòver is a municipality in the comarca of Vinalopó Mitjà in the Valencian Community, Spain.

References

Municipalities in the Province of Alicante
Vinalopó Mitjà